Alo is a 2003 Bengali family drama film directed by Tarun Majumder and starring Rituparna Sengupta. The story is based on a short story Kinnardal by Bibhutibhushan Bandopadhyay.

The film was nominated for a National Award in the category "Best Film Providing Wholesome Family Entertainment".

Plot
Alo is an educated Kolkata based woman come to her husband's ancestral village after marriage. Her husband Shuvo is a teacher who works in Kolkata. Alo starts living with the poverty stricken villagers. Alo enlightens their lifestyle, morally as well as culturally. She becomes an idol of adoration. Alo gets devastated on learning Pintu's death. She herself also dies while giving birth to her daughter but literally stands up to the meaning of her name Alo, means light or ray of hope. The women of the village take the responsibility of the girl's upbringing.

Cast
 Rituparna Sengupta as Alo Chowdhury
 Kunal Mitra as Shubhankar Chatterjee aka Subho (Professor) 
 Bhaswar Chatterjee as Himu (Subho's younger brother) 
 Abhishek Chatterjee as Binod Gupta aka Binu da (Alo's brother-in-law) 
 Nayana Das as Meera aka Ranga di (Alo's elder sister/Binu's wife)
 Soumili Biswas as Roma (Alo's sister) 
 Basanti Chatterjee as No-khurima
 Manasi Sinha
 Bharati Devi
 Rita Dutta Chakraborty as Sodu
 Pushpita Mukherjee as Renu
 Maitryee Mitra as Shantilata aka Shanti

Awards
The film was nominated for a National Award in the category "Best Film Providing Wholesome Family Entertainment".

References

External links
 

2000s Bengali-language films
Bengali-language Indian films
Films directed by Tarun Majumdar
Films based on Indian novels
Films based on works by Bibhutibhushan Bandyopadhyay
Indian drama films